SWALEC was an electricity supply and distribution company in South Wales, established in 1989 following the de-regulation of the electricity supply industry in the United Kingdom. The business has seen several changes of ownership from 1996, and the SWALEC brand has been used for retail gas supply as well as electricity. Today Western Power Distribution runs the distribution network business, and SWALEC Contracting is a trading name of OVO Energy.

Predecessor
The South Wales Electricity Board (SWEB) was formed in 1948 under the Electricity Act 1947, which brought about the nationalisation and merger of local authority and private electricity companies.

The SWEB was responsible for the purchase of electricity from the electricity generator (the Central Electricity Generating Board from 1958) and the distribution and sale of electricity to customers. The key members of the Board were: Chairman W.D.D. Fenton (1964, 1967), Deputy Chairman H. Pryce-Jones (1964, 1967), full-time member William E. Richardson (1964, 1967).

The number of customers supplied by the Board was:

The amount of electricity, in GWh, sold by South Wales Electricity Board was:

Formation 
SWEB was privatised in 1989 as South Wales Electricity, one of the regional companies created by the Electricity Act 1989. The company soon began to use the SWALEC brand.

Purchase and breakup 
The business was bought in 1996 for £872m by newly privatised company Welsh Water, which rebranded itself as Hyder. The business plan was to make significant logistical savings by combining the field activities of electricity and water supply operations by co-locating in fewer offices and operational depots.

In 1997 SWALEC Gas was set up to take advantage of the deregulation of the gas market in the UK which took place in stages from 1997 to 1998. An advertising campaign was launched featuring Wimbledon F.C. and Wales footballer Vinnie Jones.

Hyder encountered financial difficulties and in February 2000 the retail electricity and gas business under the SWALEC brand was sold to British Energy for a reported £105m. The sale included the SWALEC retail brand, whilst Hyder retained the SWALEC electricity distribution business (i.e., running the electricity network) which was renamed Infralec.

In August 2000 Scottish and Southern Energy (SSE) agreed to buy the electricity and gas supply businesses from British Energy for a reported price of £210m. In September 2000, Western Power Distribution bought Hyder for £565 million, sold Welsh Water and renamed Infralec to WPD South Wales.

SSE continued to use the SSE SWALEC brand name for the supply of electricity and gas in Wales. Following the sale of SSE's retail business to OVO Energy in 2020, SWALEC is a trading name of OVO.

From 1992 to 2013 SSE was the sponsor of Wales WRU Challenge Cup, and the SWALEC name was attached to a range of league competitions and trophies administered by the Welsh Rugby Union.

References 

Defunct electric power companies of the United Kingdom
Former nationalised industries of the United Kingdom
SSE plc
Energy companies of Wales